The Scottish National League was an ice hockey league in Scotland that existed only for the 1981-82 season. It was the first national league contested in Scotland since the old Scottish National League was held in 1954. The five Scottish teams from the Northern League participated in the league. The Dundee Rockets won the championship.

Regular season

References

Defunct ice hockey leagues in the United Kingdom
Ice hockey leagues in Scotland
Defunct sports leagues in Scotland
1981 establishments in Scotland
1982 disestablishments in Scotland
Sports leagues established in 1981
Sports leagues disestablished in 1982